Charles Ogden may refer to:

 Charles Kay Ogden (1889–1957), British linguist and philosopher
 Charles Ogden (children's writer), writer of the Edgar & Ellen series of children's books
 Charles F. Ogden (1873–1933), U.S. Representative from Kentucky
 Charles Richard Ogden (1791–1866), Canadian politician